Tiftonia (Lookout Valley) is a neighborhood of Chattanooga, Tennessee and a former unincorporated community in Hamilton County, Tennessee. It is located in the western portion of the city along Interstate 24 and US Routes 11, 41, 64, and 72.

Lookout Valley is the oldest part of Hamilton County, having been established in the late 1790s and early 1800s. In fact, the oldest house in Hamilton County is located within the community, that of John Brown's Ferry Tavern.

Education
Schools in Tiftonia/Lookout Valley are a part of Hamilton County Schools:
Lookout Valley Elementary
Lookout Valley Middle and High School

References

Neighborhoods in Chattanooga, Tennessee
Unincorporated communities in Tennessee
Unincorporated communities in Hamilton County, Tennessee
Tennessee populated places on the Tennessee River